The King of Limbs is the eighth studio album by the English rock band Radiohead. It was self-released on 18 February 2011 as a download, followed by a physical release on 28 March through XL Recordings internationally and TBD Records in North America.

Following the more conventional instrumentation of In Rainbows (2007), The King of Limbs saw Radiohead move further from standard song structures and recording methods. They developed the album with their producer Nigel Godrich through sampling and looping; the singer, Thom Yorke, described it as "an expression of wildness and mutation". The artwork, by Yorke and his longtime collaborator Stanley Donwood, depicts nature and spirits inspired by fairy tales.

Radiohead released no singles from The King of Limbs, but released a music video for "Lotus Flower" featuring Yorke's dancing that inspired an internet meme. In 2012, they began an international tour, with several festival appearances. To perform the complex rhythms live, they were joined by a second drummer, Clive Deamer. The European tour was postponed after the temporary stage collapsed in Toronto's Downsview Park, killing the technician Scott Johnson and injuring three others.

Though its unconventional production and shorter length divided listeners, The King of Limbs was named one of the best albums of the year by publications including The Wire, NME and PopMatters. It was nominated in five categories at the 54th Annual Grammy Awards, including Best Alternative Music Album. The download version sold an estimated 300,000 to 400,000 copies in two months, and the vinyl became a bestseller in the UK. The retail edition debuted at number seven on the UK Albums Chart and number six on the US Billboard 200, making it the first Radiohead album not to achieve gold certification in the US. The King of Limbs was followed by the remix album TKOL RMX 1234567, the live video The King of Limbs: Live from the Basement, and the non-album singles "Supercollider" and "The Butcher".

Recording 

Radiohead worked on The King of Limbs with their longtime producer Nigel Godrich intermittently from May 2009 to January 2011. The sessions included three weeks recording at the home of the actress Drew Barrymore in Los Angeles in early 2010.

Radiohead wanted to avoid repeating the protracted recording process of their previous album In Rainbows (2007). According to the singer, Thom Yorke, they felt that "if we are gonna carry on, we need to do it for a new set of reasons". The Radiohead cover artist, Stanley Donwood, said that whereas In Rainbows was "very much a definitive statement", the band wanted to make an album that was more "transitory". The multi-instrumentalist Jonny Greenwood said: "We didn't want to pick up guitars and write chord sequences. We didn't want to sit in front of a computer either. We wanted a third thing, which involved playing and programming."

Whereas Radiohead had developed In Rainbows from live performances, The King of Limbs developed from studio experimentation. Yorke sought to move further from conventional recording methods. After he and Godrich became interested in DJing during their time in Los Angeles, Godrich proposed a two-week experiment whereby the band used turntables and vinyl emulation software instead of conventional instruments. According to Godrich, "That two-week experiment ended up being fucking six months. And that's that record, the whole story of all of it."

Radiohead assembled much of the album by looping and editing samples of their playing. They used sampling software written by Greenwood, which he described as a "wonky, rubbish version" of Ableton Live, to create sequences of music. Yorke wrote melodies and lyrics over the sequences, which he likened to the process of editing a film. The guitarist Ed O'Brien said: "The brick walls we tended to hit were when we knew something was great, like 'Bloom', but not finished ... Then [Colin Greenwood] had that bassline, and Thom started singing. Those things suddenly made it a hundred times better." According to Godrich, the result of the recording sessions was a "gigantic mess that took me about a year and a half to unravel".

On 24 January 2010, Radiohead suspended recording to perform at the Hollywood Henry Fonda Theatre to raise funds for Oxfam responding to the 2010 Haiti earthquake. The show was released free online in December 2010 as Radiohead for Haiti, and included a performance of the future King of Limbs track "Lotus Flower" by Yorke on acoustic guitar.

Music and lyrics 

According to Rolling Stone, The King of Limbs saw Radiohead move further from conventional rock music and song structures in favour of "moody, rhythm-heavy electronica, glacially paced ballads and ambient psychedelia". Several critics noted dubstep influences. The album features extensive sampling, looping, and ambient sounds, including natural sounds such as birdsong and wind. Pitchfork said it comprised "aggressive rhythms made out of dainty bits of digital detritus, robotically repetitive yet humanly off-kilter, parched thickets of drumming graced with fleeting moments of melodic relief". According to O'Brien: "Rhythm is the king of limbs! The rhythm dictates the record. It's very important." 

Yorke said The King of Limbs was a "visual" album, with lyrics and artwork about "wildness" and "mutating" inspired by his environmental concerns. The title derives from the King of Limbs, an ancient oak tree in Savernake Forest in Wiltshire, near Tottenham House, where Radiohead recorded In Rainbows.

The first track, "Bloom", was inspired by the BBC nature documentary series The Blue Planet. It opens with a piano loop and features horns and complex rhythms. "Morning Mr Magpie" has "restless guitars". "Little by Little" features "crumbling guitar shapes" and "clattering" percussion. "Feral" features scattered vocal samples and "mulched-up" drums. "Lotus Flower" features a driving synth bassline and Yorke's falsetto. "Codex" is a piano ballad with "spectral" horns and strings and a Roland TR-808 drum machine. "Give Up the Ghost" is an acoustic guitar ballad with layered vocal harmonies. The final track, "Separator", has guitar, piano, a "brittle" drum loop and echoing vocals.

At eight tracks and 37 minutes in length, The King of Limbs is Radiohead's shortest album. O'Brien explained that Radiohead felt the ideal album was around 40 minutes long, and cited Marvin Gaye's What's Going On (1971) as a classic record shorter than The King of Limbs.

Artwork and packaging
The King of Limbs artwork was created by Yorke with Radiohead's longtime collaborator Stanley Donwood. As with previous Radiohead albums, Donwood worked as the band recorded nearby. He painted oil portraits of the Radiohead members in the style of Gerhard Richter, but abandoned them as "I'd never painted with oils before and I'm not Gerhard Richter so it was just a series of painted disasters". Instead, the music made Donwood think of "immense multicoloured cathedrals of trees, with music echoing from the branches whilst strange fauna lurked in the fog". He and Yorke drew trees with eyes, limbs, mouths, and familiars, creating "strange multi-limbed creatures" inspired by Northern European fairy tales.

For the special edition of The King of Limbs, Donwood wanted to create something "in a state of flux". He chose newspaper, which fades in sunlight, for its ephemeral nature. This reflected the album's nature themes, mirroring the natural decay of living things. Donwood took inspiration from weekend broadsheets and underground 1960s newspapers and magazines such as Oz and International Times. The special edition includes a sheet of artwork on blotting paper of the kind used to distribute LSD; Donwood said, "In theory, not that I would propose such an illegal thing, but somebody could... And I don't think that's been done as a marketing thing before." The special edition was nominated for the Best Boxed or Special Limited Edition Package at the 54th Grammy Awards.

Release
Radiohead announced The King of Limbs on their website on 14 February 2011. It was released on 18 February, a day early, as the website was ready ahead of schedule. The download version was sold for £6, with a special edition of the album, released on 9 May 2011, sold for £30. The special edition contains the album on CD and two 10-inch vinyl records, additional artwork, a special record sleeve, and a "colour piece of oxo-degradable plastic package". The King of Limbs was released on CD and vinyl on March 28, 2011 by XL Recordings in the United Kingdom, TBD in the United States and Hostess Entertainment in Japan.

On 16 April 2011, Radiohead released two further tracks from the King of Limbs sessions, "Supercollider" and "The Butcher", as a double single for Record Store Day. A few days later, the tracks were released as free downloads for those who had purchased The King of Limbs from the Radiohead website. In June 2011, Radiohead announced a series of King of Limbs remixes by various electronic artists. Yorke said the band wanted to experiment with the music further by giving it to remixers, and liked the idea that it was not "fixed and set in stone". The remixes were compiled on the album TKOL RMX 1234567, released in September 2011.

Radiohead performed The King of Limbs in its entirety for The King of Limbs: Live from the Basement, broadcast in July 2011 and released on DVD and Blu-ray in December 2011. Godrich said the performance was an effort to record the "very mechanised" album again and show it in a new light. On 11 February 2014, Radiohead released an app, Polyfauna, featuring music and imagery from The King of Limbs. In 2017, Radiohead collaborated with the film composer Hans Zimmer to record a new version of "Bloom" for the BBC nature documentary series Blue Planet II. The track, "(ocean) bloom", features new vocals by Yorke recorded alongside the BBC Concert Orchestra. In a press release, Yorke said that "Bloom" had been inspired by the original Blue Planet series, and that it was "great to be able to come full circle with the song".

Promotion 
On 18 February, Radiohead released a music video for "Lotus Flower" on YouTube, featuring black-and-white footage of Yorke dancing. It was directed by Garth Jennings and choreographed by Wayne McGregor. The video inspired the "Dancing Thom Yorke" internet meme, whereby fans replaced the audio or edited the visuals, and "#thomdance" became a trending hashtag on Twitter. A promotional broadcast in Shibuya Crossing, Tokyo, was canceled due to security concerns.

On 28 March 2011, to promote the retail release of The King of Limbs, Radiohead distributed a free newspaper, the Universal Sigh, at independent record shops across the world. Donwood and Yorke distributed copies in person at the Rough Trade record shop in east London. Influenced by free newspapers such as LA Weekly or London Lite, the Universal Sigh is a 12-page tabloid printed using web-offset lithography on newsprint paper and features artwork, poetry, and lyrics, plus short stories by Donwood, Jay Griffiths and Robert Macfarlane.

Tour

Radiohead did not perform The King of Limbs live until several months after its release, as Yorke wanted to continue studio work and it took some time to arrange the album for performance. To perform the album's complex rhythms, they enlisted a second drummer, Clive Deamer, who had worked with Portishead and Get the Blessing. Selway said: "That was fascinating. One played in the traditional way, the other almost mimicked a drum machine. It was push-and-pull, like kids at play, really interesting." Deamer has joined Radiohead for subsequent tours.

On 24 June 2011, Radiohead played a surprise performance on the Park stage at the 2011 Glastonbury Festival, performing mainly new material. The Guardian critic Rosie Swash gave the performance a mixed review, saying the audience had hoped for older songs. In September, Radiohead played two dates at New York City's Roseland Ballroom and made American TV appearances including the season premiere of Saturday Night Live and an hour-long special of The Colbert Report. In 2012, Radiohead toured Europe, North America, and Asia, with appearances at the Bonnaroo, Coachella and Fuji Rock festivals. They played mainly arenas, as O'Brien said the "precise and detailed" King of Limbs material would not suit outdoor venues.

On 16 June 2012, the stage collapsed during the setup for a show at Toronto's Downsview Park, killing drum technician Scott Johnson and injuring three other members of Radiohead's road crew. The show was canceled and Radiohead's tour dates in Europe were postponed. After rescheduling the tour, Radiohead paid tribute to Johnson and their stage crew at their next concert, in Nîmes, France, in July. In 2013, Live Nation Canada Inc, two other organisations and an engineer were charged with 13 charges. Following a delay caused by mistrial, the case was dropped in 2017 under the Jordan ruling, which puts time limits on cases. Radiohead released a statement condemning the decision. A 2019 inquest returned a verdict of accidental death.

Sales
On the Radiohead website, where it was exclusively available for nearly two months prior to its retail release, The King of Limbs sold between 300,000 and 400,000 download copies. Radiohead's co-manager Chris Hufford estimated that Radiohead made more money from The King of Limbs than any of their previous albums, as most sales were made through their website without a record company.

The retail edition debuted at number seven on the UK Albums Chart, ending Radiohead's streak of five consecutive number-one UK albums, and sold 33,469 copies in its first week.  The vinyl edition, excluding special edition sales, sold more than 20,000 copies in the UK in the first half of 2011, 12% of all vinyl sold in that period, and became the bestselling vinyl album of 2011. , it was the decade's second-bestselling vinyl in the UK.

In the US, the retail edition debuted at number six on the Billboard 200, with first-week sales of 69,000 copies. The following week, it peaked at number three, selling 67,000 copies. By April 2012, The King of Limbs had sold 307,000 retail copies in the US, making it Radiohead's first album not to achieve gold certification there. This was credited to the surprise release; Radiohead's co-manager Bryce Edge said some fans did not realise Radiohead had released a new record.

Reception

At Metacritic, which aggregates scores from mainstream critics, The King of Limbs has an average score of 80 based on 40 reviews, indicating "generally favourable reviews". Michael Brodeur of the Boston Globe praised "the tense calm these eight songs maintain—a composure that feels constantly ready to crack", and wrote that "where In Rainbows was mellow but brisk – an album that felt on its way somewhere – these songs are eerie and insidious, creeping like shadows". PopMatters Corey Beasley wrote: "The King of Limbs is a beautiful record, one that begs more of a conscious listen than its predecessor, but one that provides equal – if different – thrills in doing so."

François Marchand of the Vancouver Sun said that the album "bridges Radiohead's many different styles" and was "worth embracing". The critic Robert Christgau awarded the album a two-star "honourable mention" and recommended the songs "Little by Little" and "Bloom". The Quietus critic Ben Graham felt it could be Radiohead's best work, writing that it returned to the style of their albums Kid A and Amnesiac with "a greater maturity and weight of experience that enriches both the songs and the process".

Some felt The King of Limbs was less innovative than Radiohead's prior albums. Mark Pytlik of Pitchfork called it "well-worn terrain for Radiohead, and while it continues to yield rewarding results, the band's signature game-changing ambition is missed". AllMusic editor Stephen Thomas Erlewine described it as "Radiohead doing what they do ... without flash or pretension, gently easing from the role of pioneers to craftsmen". Luke Lewis of NME felt it was "a record to respect for its craft, rather than worship for its greatness".

In the Los Angeles Times, Ann Powers wrote that The King of Limbs had divided listeners, with some finding it too low-key, abstract, or "doomy", or too similar to Radiohead's previous work. Some fans, having waited years for the follow-up to In Rainbows, were disappointed by a shorter album that felt "relatively dashed together". Unfounded rumours spread of a second album soon to be released, bolstered by the lyrics of the final track, "Separator": "If you think this is over then you're wrong".

In a 2015 article for Stereogum, Ryan Leas concluded that The King of Limbs was "very good, occasionally great music by a pivotal band that nevertheless felt like something of a letdown because it wasn't, ultimately, some genius stroke none of us expected". Many listeners preferred The King of Limbs: Live From the Basement, including Leas, who wrote: "You hear muscle and movement and bodies existing where the now tapped-out ingenuity of Radiohead's electronic impulses has begun to make their recorded music brittle."

In 2021, the Consequence of Sound critic Jordan Blum and the Stereogum writer Chris Deville both wrote that The King of Limbs remained Radiohead's most divisive record. Some fans found it too short, or too "shallow and ephemeral"; Blum and Deville credited the disappointment to expectations set by the "warm and approachable" In Rainbows, which had boosted Radiohead's influence with its innovative pay-what-you-want release. Deville also speculated that the running order, with the less accessible songs on the first half, had lost some listeners.

Accolades 
The King of Limbs was named one of the best albums of 2011 by several publications, including the Wire, the Guardian, Mojo, NME, PopMatters, Uncut and Rolling Stone. At the 54th Grammy Awards, it was nominated for Best Alternative Music Album and Best Boxed or Special Limited Edition Package. "Lotus Flower" was nominated for Best Short Form Music Video, Best Rock Performance and Best Rock Song.

Track listing

All songs written by Radiohead.

Side one

 "Bloom" – 5:15
 "Morning Mr Magpie" – 4:41
 "Little by Little" – 4:27
 "Feral" – 3:13

Side two

 "Lotus Flower" – 5:01
 "Codex" – 4:47
 "Give Up the Ghost" – 4:50
 "Separator" – 5:20

Personnel 

Radiohead

 Colin Greenwood
 Jonny Greenwood
 Ed O'Brien
 Philip Selway
 Thom Yorke

Additional musicians
 Noel Langley – flugelhorn on "Bloom" and "Codex"
 Yazz Ahmed – flugelhorn on "Bloom" and "Codex"
 The London Telefilmonic Orchestra – strings on "Codex"
 Levine Andrade – leading
 Robert Ziegler – conducting

Production
 Nigel Godrich – production, engineering, mixing
 Drew Brown – additional engineering
 Darrell Thorp – additional assistance
 Bryan Cook – additional assistance
 Bob Ludwig – mastering

Artwork
 Thom Yorke (credited as Zachariah Wildwood)
 Stanley Donwood (credited as Donald Twain)

Charts

Weekly charts

Year-end charts

Certifications and sales

References

External links 
 Official Radiohead website

2011 albums
Radiohead albums
Albums produced by Nigel Godrich
Self-released albums
XL Recordings albums